Macario Pinilla Vargas (24 November 1855 – 3 September 1927) was a Bolivian lawyer and politician who served as the 17th vice president of Bolivia from 1909 to 1913. He served as first vice president alongside second vice president Juan Misael Saracho during the administration of Eliodoro Villazón.

Biography 
Macario Pinilla Vargas was born in La Paz on 24 November 1855. His parents were Juan Pinilla and Eduarda Vargas. He began his studies at the Ayacucho College in 1863, receiving a law degree in 1876. Pinilla was elected deputy for La Paz in 1888 and District Attorney of La Paz in 1892.

In 1899, following the defeat of the Conservatives in the Federal War, he became one of the heads the Federal Government Junta, a civil-military triumvirate composed of himself, José Manuel Pando, and Serapio Reyes Ortiz. Following the election of Pando as president by the National Assembly, he was appointed Minister before the Court of Spain on 12 December 1899. In 1902 and again in 1908, he was elected Senator for the department of La Paz. In the general election of 1909, he was elected first vice president for Eliodoro Villazón, taking office on 12 August. Alongside this position, he served as Minister to the governments of the Netherlands and France.

He died in the city of La Paz on 3 September 1927 at the age of 71.

References 

1846 births
1910 deaths
Liberal Party (Bolivia) politicians
Vice presidents of Bolivia